Oil City is a populated place located in Hutchinson County, Texas. Its elevation is 2,959 feet.

References

Towns in Texas